Raymond Souplex (1 June 1901 – 22 November 1972) was a French actor and singer. He was in a long-term relationship with Jane Sourza, although they never married.

Filmography

1901 births
1972 deaths
Male actors from Paris
Musicians from Paris
French male film actors
French male stage actors
French male television actors
20th-century French male actors
20th-century French male singers